The following is a list of items with recorded Factory Records numbers. The list primarily consists of music releases but also includes promotional graphics, film, etc. However, the list was not confined to creative output. A party (FAC 83), a lawsuit (FAC 61) and a cat (FAC 191) appear on the list along with other miscellany.

Number allocation was only roughly chronological. Special numbers were reserved for significant Factory output. For instance, albums by Joy Division and New Order are typically cataloged under multiples of 25; the sole exceptions to this are two Joy Division albums: Unknown Pleasures (FACT 10) and Still (FACT 40). The final recording issued by Factory, Happy Mondays' 1992 single "Sunshine & Love", bears the number FAC 372; nevertheless, a handful of recordings issued earlier (sometimes years earlier) have higher catalogue numbers.

After Factory Records declared bankruptcy in 1992, Factory co-founder Tony Wilson continued to assign Factory numbers to numerous events and magazine interviews through to his death in 2007. Other late-period Factory catalogue items include a film (FAC 401), a recording issued by another label (FACT 500), a poster for a 2004 memorial event honouring Rob Gretton (FAC 511), and Tony Wilson's own coffin (FAC 501).

Several numbers (e.g., FAC 317/318/319) were multiply allocated to unrelated projects. As well, many of the catalogue numbers, especially those above FAC 330, weren't allocated at all (or were allocated to unreleased or unrealized projects).

For Factory Benelux, see Factory Benelux discography.

The Factory numbering system 

The last digit of the number may designate the following (but inconsistencies abound): 1 - Factory Corporate, 2 - Happy Mondays (singles), 3 - Joy Division / New Order (singles), 4 - Durutti Column, 6 - Factory Classical.

The "FACT" designation (as opposed to "FAC") usually denotes an album. The "FACD" designation is oftentimes used to denote compact disc releases of albums, though it is sometimes applied to LP and cassette releases as well; the designation "FACTUS" is typically used for American releases regardless of format.

Sometimes the number can contain a further insight:

FACT 24, Various Artists: A Factory Quartet (album [x2]): 2 records, 4 artists, thus 2/4. (In addition, Durutti Column ["4"; see above] is on this release.)	
FAC 148, Styal Mill Sponsored Bucket (sponsorship): One of 48 blades on the mill wheel, thus 1/48.
FAC 289, New Order: Campaign Technique (notepaper): Campaign ran in February 1989, thus 2/89. (This number was also used for The Wendys The Sun's Going to Shine For Me Soon single 2 years later. Double number assignments occur a few times within the catalogue.)
FAC 321, Jonathan Demme: The Perfect Kiss (video). This is the reverse number of the release the video was made for: FAC 123, New Order: The Perfect Kiss. In addition, as noted above, 123 would signify a New Order single, and 321 a Factory Corporate project.

Catalogue

References

Sources

External links
 Factory Benelux
 Factory Overseas, Australia, Japan & Canada
 FAC-421, David Sultan's site

Discographies of British record labels
Madchester
Factory Records